Nathalie Selambarom (born 3 February 1971) is a French female handball player. She was a member of the France women's national handball team. She was part of the  team at the 2000 Summer Olympics, playing seven matches. On club level she played for Metz Handball in Metz.

References

Living people
Handball players at the 2000 Summer Olympics
1971 births
French female handball players
Olympic handball players of France
People from Saint-Louis, Réunion